"Duke of Cornwall" appears as a title in pseudo-historical authors such as Geoffrey of Monmouth. The list is patchy and not every succession was unbroken. Indeed, Monmouth repeatedly introduces Dukes of Cornwall only to promote them to the Kingship of the Britons and thus put an end to their line as (merely) dukes. As adjuncts or supporting roles to the kings of the Britons, the legendary dukes of Cornwall are considered part of the vast Matter of Britain, and can also be found in other stories, such as Culhwch and Olwen, the Prose Tristan, Havelok the Dane, and Gesta Herewardi. Antiquaries such as Richard Carew (Survey of Cornwall, 1602) and John Williams (the Book of Baglan, 1600–1607) also provide lists of legendary rulers of Cornwall, often combining the above with other sources.

As a result, these lists are more often thought of as a conglomeration of various Celtic rulers, Celtic warlords, and mythical heroes. If the lists of kings of Britain are legendary, then the list of dukes must be considered still more a genealogical and historical legend with no solid basis in the view of most historians. The titles given for the rulers also vary, even within sources; Monmouth's History, has the title fluctuating between "duke" (dux Cornubiae) and "king" (rex Cornubiae), and Carew wrote that before the Norman Conquest "these titles of honour carry a kinde of confusednes, and rather betokened a successive office, then an established dignity. The following ages received a more distinct forme, and left us a certeyner notice."

Pre-Arthurian

Arthurian
Sources diverge leading up to the time of King Arthur, with Caradoc placed either during the time of Arthur (as in the Welsh Triads, and later tradition), soon before Gorlois (Carew's Survey of Cornwall), or before his brother Dionotus as Caradocus in the Historia Regum Britanniae. The Book of Baglan provides an entirely different set of ancestors leading up to Gorlois, while other sources, such as Culhwch and Olwen and the Prose Tristan, replace Gorlois altogether with Ricca and Mark respectively.

Welsh Triads

Historia Regum Britanniae

Survey of Cornwall

Book of Baglan

Culhwch and Olwen

William Worcester's Itineraries

Prose Tristan

"King Arthur and King Cornwall"

Post Arthurian

Historia Regum Britanniae

Havelok the Dane

Survey of Cornwall

Book of Baglan

Gesta Herewardi

See also
 Earl of Cornwall
 Duke of Cornwall
 List of legendary kings of Britain
 List of kings of Dumnonia
 Dumnonia
 History of Cornwall
 Cornovii (Cornish)

Notes

References

Cornwall, Dukes of, Legendary
Cornwall, Dukes of, Legendary
Geoffrey of Monmouth
Dukes of Cornwall, Legendary
Cornwall-related biographical lists